Three-time defending champions Diede de Groot and Aniek van Koot defeated Yui Kamiji and Jordanne Whiley in the final, 6–3, 6–4 to win the women's doubles wheelchair tennis title at the 2021 French Open.

Seeds

Draw

Finals

References

External Links
 Draw

Wheelchair Women's Doubles
French Open, 2021 Women's Doubles